ʻĪao Valley (Hawaiian: Īao: "cloud supreme", pronounced similar to "EE-yow") is a lush, stream-cut valley in West Maui, Hawaii, located  west of Wailuku. Because of its natural environment and history, it has become a tourist location.  It was designated a National Natural Landmark in 1972.

ʻĪao Valley State Monument 

The "needle" is a sharp ridge that gives the appearance of being a spire when viewed end-on. The needle is an extension of and surrounded by the cliffs of the West Maui Mountains, an extinct volcano. There is a short trail (ʻĪao Needle Lookout Trail and Ethnobotanical Loop) to a windy overlook.

Rainforest 
ʻĪao Valley is covered in dense rainforest, most of which consists of introduced vegetation on the valley floor. The Puu Kukui summit area at the valley's head receives an average  of rainfall per year, making it the state's second wettest location after The Big Bog, slightly wetter than Mount Waialeale. Much of this rainfall ends up flowing into the ʻĪao Stream. Trails in the State Park run alongside ʻĪao Stream and through the forest.

Above the ʻĪao valley at the Puʻu Kukui watershed is a native cloud forest of ʻOhiʻa and Koa. This forest is home to many native species including ʻIʻiwi, ʻApapane, And ʻAmakihi.

History 

The Hawaiian god Kāne is considered to be the procreator and the provider of life. He is associated with wai (fresh water) as well as clouds, rain, streams, and springs. Kanaloa, the Hawaiian god of the underworld, is represented by the phallic stone of the ʻĪao Needle.

Kapawa, the king of Hawaii prior to Pili, was buried here. Maui's ruler Kakae, in the late 15th century, designated ʻĪao Valley as an alii burial ground. The remains were buried in secret places. In 1790, the Battle of Kepaniwai took place there, in which Kamehameha the Great defeated Kalanikūpule and the Maui army during his campaign to unify the islands. The battle was said to be so bloody that dead bodies blocked ʻĪao Stream, and the battle site was named Kepaniwai ("the damming of the waters").

Kepaniwai Park and Heritage Gardens 
Established in 1952, the Heritage Gardens in Kepaniwai Park recognize the multicultural history of Maui. Tributes and structures celebrate the contributions of Hawaiian, American missionary, Chinese, Japanese, Portuguese, Korean, and Filipino cultures. The gardens had become overgrown and were restored in 1994. The Hawaii nature center, just outside the gardens, has a museum and children's education about Hawaii and conservation.

References

Further reading
 
 

Valleys of Hawaii
State parks of Hawaii
Landforms of Maui
Protected areas of Maui
National Natural Landmarks in Hawaii
Protected areas established in 1972
1972 establishments in Hawaii